The Letov Š-8 was a Czech racing aircraft designed by Alois Šmolik. The aircraft was wooden-built, mostly fabric covered, with tail-skid undercarriage and was powered by a Napier Lion engine.

Specifications

See also

References

1920s Czechoslovakian aircraft
Racing aircraft
Aircraft first flown in 1923
Š-8